AVN-101, a close structural analogue of latrepirdine, is a selective 5-HT6 receptor antagonist which is under development by Avineuro Pharmaceuticals for the treatment of Alzheimer's disease and anxiety disorders. As of November 2013, it was in phase II clinical trials for these indications.

See also 
 List of investigational anxiolytics
 AVN-211

References

External links 
 Pipeline - Avineuro Pharmaceuticals, Inc.
 CNS Platform - AllaChem
 AVN-101 - AdisInsight

5-HT6 antagonists
Anxiolytics
Nootropics